Beryl Atieno Wamira (born 20 June 1995) is a Kenyan female deaf track and field athlete. She competed in the 2013 Summer Deaflympics and in the 2017 Summer Deaflympics representing Kenya. She has won a total of 3 medals in her Deaflympic career including a Junior deaf world record breaking gold medal in the women's 200m event during the 2013 Summer Deaflympics.

She too clinched silver medals in the women's 100m and 200m events at the 2017 Summer Deaflympics. Beryl Wamira currently holds the youth (junior) deaf world records in athletics for women in the 100m, 200m individual events and both of her deaf junior world records were set by her in the 2013 Summer Deaflympics.

References

External links 
 Profile at All athletics.com
 Profile at ICSD
 Profile at Deaflympics

1995 births
Living people
Kenyan female sprinters
Deaf competitors in athletics
Place of birth missing (living people)
Kenyan deaf people
20th-century Kenyan women
21st-century Kenyan women